Dembow is a Dominican musical genre that can be traced to a riddim that originated in Jamaican dancehall. When Shabba Ranks released "Dem Bow" in 1990, it did not take long for the dembow genre to form. Riddims were built from the song and the sound became a popular part of reggaeton. From there it took off in Dominican Republic creating the sound UNDERWORLD ("Bajo Mundo" in Spanish). It hit the streets of New York and from there it made its way to all of Latin America. The Dominican Dembow sound keeps evolving and has been fusioned with Trap music since 2016. It's also fused with Bachata and Merengue from the Dominican Republic. Dembow artists are called "Dembowseros".

Characteristics 

The main element of dembow music is its rhythm, which is somewhat reminiscent of reggaeton and dancehall music, but with a more constant rhythm and faster beats per minute than reggaeton.  Rhythm and melodies in dembow tend to be simple and repetitive.

See also
Reggaeton
Latin trap
Tresillo (rhythm)

References 

Jamaican music
Reggae genres
Riddims
Caribbean music genres